Guadalupe Valdez (born October 11, 1947) is an American law enforcement official who served as Sheriff of Dallas County, Texas, from 2005 to 2017, and was the Democratic nominee for Governor of Texas in the 2018 gubernatorial election. She lost to the incumbent, Greg Abbott.

Early life 
Valdez was born and raised in San Antonio, as the youngest of eight children of Mexican-American migrant farm worker parents.
She started life by working in the fields but paid her way through college. She earned a bachelor's degree in Business Administration from Southern Nazarene University in Bethany, Oklahoma, and later a master's degree in criminology and criminal justice from the University of Texas at Arlington.

Early career 
Prior to entering law enforcement, Lupe Valdez was an officer in the United States Army Reserve, where she attained the rank of captain.

Her law enforcement career began as a jailer, first in a county jail and then in a federal prison. She then moved on to investigative roles as an agent of the General Services Administration, the U.S. Department of Agriculture and, finally, the U.S. Customs Service. With the creation of the Department of Homeland Security in 2002, she was made a Senior Agent, serving in that role until her retirement. In January 2004, Valdez retired to run for the office of Dallas County Sheriff. In 2009, Valdez completed Harvard University's John F. Kennedy School of Government program for Senior Executives in State and Local Government as a David Bohnett LGBTQ Victory Institute Leadership Fellow.

Political career

Elections and terms as sheriff 
On January 2, 2004, Lupe Valdez announced her candidacy for the Democratic nomination for Dallas County Sheriff. During the primary election, she faced three opponents, and finished as the highest vote-getter with 13,867 votes. She subsequently won a run-off election against future Dallas County Judge Jim Foster. Valdez won 73 percent of the vote in the run-off.

As she entered the general campaign, Valdez was widely considered the underdog in her general election race against Republican Danny Chandler. Chandler, a 30-year veteran of the Sheriff's Department, had defeated incumbent Sheriff Jim Bowles in the Republican primary. Bowles, who was tainted by corruption allegations, had held the office for 20 years. As an openly lesbian candidate for public office, Valdez's campaign won the backing of the Gay & Lesbian Victory Fund.  The general election saw Valdez beat Chandler by 51.3% to 48.7%, a margin of some 18,000 votes.

She was sworn in on January 1, 2005.  Upon taking office as Dallas County Sheriff, Valdez faced a department that was wracked by poor morale, tainted by allegations of corruption and marred by the fact that the Dallas County Jail had begun failing state and federal inspections prior to her election. The jail had failed inspections because of poor sanitation conditions which endanger prisoners, many of whom have not ultimately been found to be guilty of any crime and are merely being held pending being formally charged or, released; a failing smoke evacuation system, unacceptable medical care, and a lack of sufficient guards to meet the legally required guard-to-inmate ratio.

Although the Dallas County Jail had begun failing state and federal inspections prior to Valdez being elected to office, the jail continued to fail inspections every year thereafter until 2010, when the jail passed certification by the State of Texas for the first time since 2003.

Valdez formally filed for re-election to a second term on December 3, 2007. Valdez won the 2008 primary, narrowly avoiding a runoff by winning 50.85% in a four-candidate field on March 4, 2008.  On November 4, 2008, Lupe Valdez was re-elected Sheriff of Dallas County with 388,327 votes to Lowell Cannaday's 322,808 votes, a margin of roughly 65,500. Valdez received over 99,000 more votes than the "Straight Democratic" option. She won in precincts across Dallas County, including formerly Republican areas including Valley Ranch in Irving and Mesquite. She began her second four-year term on January 1, 2009.

In 2010, the Dallas County Jails passed inspection by the State of Texas for the first time since 2003. Completion of a new jail facility in 2009 and continued investment from Dallas County were cited as steps towards re-certification of the Dallas County jail system, which passed inspection once again in 2011.  Also in 2010, Sheriff Valdez was elected to the Democratic National Committee and was appointed by President Barack Obama to a committee regarding immigration reform.

In November 2012, Valdez won a third term, defeating Republican challenger Kirk Launius.  In 2015, Valdez "changed policies on holding immigrants in the Dallas County jail for federal officials once the person is past his or her release date. People who committed minor offenses aren’t held for up to an additional 48 hours for agents of U.S. Immigration and Customs Enforcement, or ICE."  This brought a warning from Governor Greg Abbott to "back down from a policy change on federal immigration detention requests."

In November 2016, Valdez won a fourth term with 58 percent of the vote, again defeating Republican Kirk Launius.

2018 Texas gubernatorial election 

In December 2017, Valdez announced her candidacy for Governor of Texas in the 2018 gubernatorial election against incumbent Republican Governor Greg Abbott. In the March 6, 2018 Primary she got more votes than any other Democrat, leading her closest competitor, Andrew White, son of former governor Mark White, by 16 percent. However, she only received 43% of the vote, forcing a run-off against White. The run-off occurred on May 22, 2018, resulting in Valdez's victory and making her the first Latina and first openly gay person nominated for governor by a major party in the state. Abbott won the election.

References

External links 
Election homepage

|-

1947 births
American women police officers
American politicians of Mexican descent
Hispanic and Latino American women in politics
Lesbian politicians
LGBT Christians
LGBT Hispanic and Latino American people
LGBT law enforcement workers
LGBT people from Texas
American LGBT politicians
Living people
People from Dallas County, Texas
People from San Antonio
Texas sheriffs
United States Customs Service personnel
University of Texas at Arlington alumni
Women in Texas politics
Women sheriffs
Candidates in the 2018 United States elections
21st-century American women